Aquilegia eximia is a species of columbine known by the common names serpentine columbine or  Van Houtte's columbine. It is endemic to California, where it grows in the moist forests of the Coast Ranges, usually on serpentine soils.

Description
This is a perennial herb growing from a thick caudex and varying in height, reaching a maximum height near 1.5 meters. The lower leaves are divided into large, leaflike segments up to 4 or 5 centimeters long and a lobed oval in shape. Leaves farther up the stem are not segmented but may be deeply lobed. The inflorescence bears a large, nodding columbine flower. Each flower has five bright red to orange-red flat sepals up to nearly 3 centimeters long, and five petals which are hollow spurs up to 4 centimeters long, bright orange-red on the outer surface and lighter orange to yellow inside. The mouth of each hollow petal tube is up to a centimeter wide. The sepals and petals are generally reflexed back toward the stem and the five pistils and many thin stamens extend forward from the center of the flower.

Landscape use
An excellent landscape plant for some regions of California.

References

External links
UC Davis Arboretum All-Stars
Jepson Manual Treatment
Photo gallery

eximia
Flora of California
Plants described in 1857
Flora without expected TNC conservation status